Kristin Eklund (born 1979) is a Swedish artist who uses the stage name Naimi. She grew up in the small village of Kroksjö situated in Nybro Municipality, Småland, in the south of Sweden. Kristin Eklund have been playing various instrument since she was 7 years old, it started as for so many other Swedish artist in The Municipal music school. Music have been a very important part of Kristin Eklund's family; her sister Anna Eklund is the lead singer in the Swedish band Sad Day for Puppets. When Kristin Eklund bought a pump organ in 1998, this came to be the start of making music in earnest, for her. It was also then she took the stage name Naimi, after her grandmother. Her music can be described as diverse and obstinate, she plays guitar, piano, organ, Keyboard, etc., and also makes electronic music with winks to the 1980s computer and video game music. The Lyrics are in both Swedish and English.

Today she is active in Stockholm. Kristin Eklund is also an artist and work with a variety of techniques, including painting, drawing, photography, video and animation. She is also behind the comic "Ensam är ledsen" on the Internet, which have a direct translated English spin-off, called "Sad and Lonely". In January 2010, Kristin Eklund started her own record label. Bitterljuv, which means bittersweet, a reference to her music.

Discography 
 2001 – Benno presents Vol.5. 7" Vinyl-EP. (Benno).
 2005 – Lagom är sämst. EP. (Music Is My Girlfriend).
 2006 – Det är jag som bestämmer inte du. CD. (To Whom It May Concern)
 2010 – Försöker lämna det gamla bakom mig CDS (Free to Download) (Bitterljuv).
 2010 – Demonen, kärleken och jag. CD. (Bitterljuv).
 2014 – A New Beginning. (with Ars Sonor) CD. (Art1ficial Records).

References

Printed references 

 Interview with Kristin Eklund (Naimi). Det grymma svärdet, NR2 2008 (P.57-61). Lystring 2008

External links 

 
 Naimi on MySpace
 Naimi on Last.fm

1979 births
Living people
Swedish artists
Swedish keyboardists